Javier Spencer (born 28 March 2000) is an Antiguan cricketer. He made his List A debut for the West Indies Under-19s in the 2016–17 Regional Super50 on 27 January 2017. In May 2018, he was selected to play for the Guyana national cricket team in the Professional Cricket League draft, ahead of the 2018–19 season. In October 2019, he was named in the Leeward Islands' squad for the 2019–20 Regional Super50 tournament.

References

External links
 

2000 births
Living people
Antigua and Barbuda cricketers
West Indies under-19 cricketers
Place of birth missing (living people)